The 104th Street station is a skip-stop station on the BMT Jamaica Line of the New York City Subway, located on Jamaica Avenue between 102nd and 104th Streets in Richmond Hill, Queens. It is served by the Z train during rush hours in the peak direction, and the J at all other times.

History 
This station opened on May 28, 1917 under the Brooklyn Union Elevated Railroad, an affiliate of the Brooklyn Rapid Transit Company. The former Brooklyn Manor station on the LIRR's defunct Rockaway Beach Branch, which was closed in 1962, is two blocks to the west and could be an available transfer if the Rockaway Beach Branch is reopened for train service.

Until 1966, this station was known as 102nd Street. It was then given the dual name of 102nd–104th Streets. As of 2011, station signage and the official map give the station name as 104th Street.

The Manhattan-bound platform of this station was closed for renovation from March 13, 2017 until April 11, 2018, delayed from summer 2017. The Jamaica Center-bound platform of the station closed on July 23, 2018 for repairs, and reopened to the public on December 21, 2018.

Station layout

This elevated station has two tracks and two side platforms, but there is room for a center track. Both platforms have beige windscreens and brown canopies with green frames and support columns for their entire length except for a small section at either end. Here, there are only waist-high steel fences with lampposts. The station signs are in the standard black name plate with white lettering.

The 1990 artwork is called Five Points of Observation by Kathleen McCarthy. It is made of copper mesh, allowing a view of the streets from the platforms, and resembles a human face when viewed from the street. It is found on five other stations on the BMT Jamaica Line.

Exits
This station has one active station house beneath the platforms near the east end. A single staircase from each platform goes down to a waiting area/crossunder, where a turnstile bank provides access to and from the station. Outside fare control, there is a token booth and two staircases to the street. One faces south and goes down to the southeast corner of 104th Street and Jamaica Avenue while the other faces west and goes down to the north side of Jamaica Avenue near the northwest corner of 104th Street. The station house has concrete flooring and windscreens going halfway up the platform stairs.

This station formerly had another mezzanine at 102nd Street. The station house and stairs to the street have been removed, all that remains is the ceiling and some support I-Beams.

References

External links 

 104th Street entrance from Google Maps Street View
Platforms from Google Maps Street View

BMT Jamaica Line stations
1917 establishments in New York City
New York City Subway stations in Queens, New York
Railway stations in the United States opened in 1917
Richmond Hill, Queens